Nizhneye Abdryashevo (Tübänge Äbdräş) is a rural locality (a village) in Almukhametovsky Selsoviet, Abzelilovsky District, Bashkortostan, Russia. The population was 67 as of 2010. There is 1 street.

Geography 
Nizhneye Abdryashevo is located 64 km south of Askarovo (the district's administrative centre) by road. Verkhneye Abdryashevo is the nearest rural locality.

References 

Rural localities in Abzelilovsky District